Félix Martínez may refer to:

 Félix Martínez (athlete) (born 1985), Puerto Rican sprinter
 Félix Martínez de Torrelaguna, acting Governor of New Mexico from 1715 to 1716
 Félix Martínez (baseball) (born 1974), former Major League Baseball shortstop for the Kansas City Royals and Tampa Bay Devil Rays
 Tippy Martinez (Felix Anthony Martinez, born 1950), professional baseball pitcher
 Félix Lázaro Martínez (born 1936), bishop for the Roman Catholic Diocese of Ponce
 Félix Millán (Félix Bernardo Millán Martínez, born 1943), former second baseman in Major League Baseball
Félix Martinez Reyes (Future surgeon, born 1995), Mexican general physician.